Alphonse Peter Weber (1904 – 1 October 1963) was a Canadian politician from the province of Saskatchewan who represented the constituency of Meadow Lake from 1956–1960.

Personal life 
Weber was born in St. Leo, Minnesota, United States. Weber was educated at Muenster in Saskatchewan and lived at Meadow Lake from 1942. He worked as an elevator agent. He was also a member of the local Rotary Club and a member of the Knights of Columbus.

Political career 
Weber was elected and served on the Town Council of Meadow Lake for six years, four of which as Mayor. Weber represented Meadow Lake on the Legislative Assembly of Saskatchewan as a member of the Social Credit Party of Saskatchewan. He defeated the incumbent Liberal Hugh Clifford Dunfield.

Death 
Weber died in Meadow Lake, Saskatchewan.

Electoral record

References 

1904 births
1963 deaths
American emigrants to Canada
People from Meadow Lake, Saskatchewan
People from Yellow Medicine County, Minnesota
Social Credit Party of Saskatchewan MLAs
20th-century Canadian politicians